Mountelgonia thikaensis is a moth of the family Cossidae. It is found east of the eastern Great Rift Valley in the central highlands of Kenya. The habitat consists of a mosaic of scattered tree grassland and riverine forests.

The wingspan is about 20 mm. The forewings are warm buff, the costal margin and veins with a clay colour. The hindwings are glossy ivory yellow, with slightly darker veins.

Etymology
The species is named after the type locality of Thika.

References

Endemic moths of Kenya
Moths described in 2013
Mountelgonia
Moths of Africa